Daniel "Dan" Schaefer (January 25, 1936 – April 16, 2006) was an American politician who served as the U.S. representative for Colorado's 6th congressional district from 1983 to 1999.

Early life and education 
Born in Guttenberg, Iowa, he attended public schools. He received his Bachelor of Arts degree from Niagara University. He also attended Potsdam University from 1961 to 1964.

Career 
Schaefer served in the United States Marine Corps from 1955 to 1957 and attained the rank of sergeant. He then worked as a public relations consultant.

In 1976, he was elected to a two-year term in the Colorado General Assembly. Two years later, he was elected to the Colorado State Senate, where he served from 1979 to 1983. He was a delegate to Colorado State Republican conventions between 1972 and 1982.

Schaefer was elected as a Republican to the Ninety-eighth United States Congress, by special election, to fill the vacancy caused by the death of United States Representative-elect Jack Swigert, a former astronaut who died of cancer before he could take his seat in Congress. Schaefer polled 49,816 votes (63 percent) in the special election to 27,779 ballots (35 percent) for the Democrat Steve Hogan. No Democrat challenged Schaefer in 1984. In successive elections from 1986 to 1996, he polled more than 60 percent of the vote against each of his Democratic opponents. In his last race in 1996, he received 146,018 votes (62 percent) to 88,600 ballots (38 percent) for the Democrat Joan Fitz-Gerald.

Schaefer did not run for re-election to the 106th United States Congress in 1998. He was succeeded by Republican Congressman Tom Tancredo.

Death 
Schaefer died of cancer at the age of 70.

References

External links

 Retrieved on 2008-07-08
 

1936 births
2006 deaths
Republican Party Colorado state senators
Republican Party members of the Colorado House of Representatives
United States Marines
Niagara University alumni
People from Guttenberg, Iowa
Deaths from cancer in Colorado
Republican Party members of the United States House of Representatives from Colorado
20th-century American politicians